Alfred Mottard (11 August 1892 – 24 January 1945) was a Belgian racing cyclist. He rode in the 1920 Tour de France.

References

External links
 

1892 births
1945 deaths
Belgian male cyclists
Place of birth missing